The Tower of Hananeel (or Hananel;  hanan'e-el, chanan'-el, "El (God) is gracious") is a tower in the walls of Jerusalem, adjoining the Tower of Meah (or Hammeah: "the Tower of the Hundred") to the east connecting to the "sheep gate". It is mentioned in Nehemiah 3:1 and Nehemiah 12:39. It is located on the northern wall section of the old city, near the northeastern corner, a point of the city always requiring special fortification and later the sites successively of the Hasmonean Baris and of the Antonia Fortress.

Biblical accounts
The prophet Jeremiah foretold the rebuilding of Jerusalem:

About 150 years later, the walls of Jerusalem were built again under Nehemiah:

As soon as the walls were ready they had a dedication feast with gladness, both with thanksgivings, and with singing, cymbals, psalteries, and with harps. 

Zechariah placed this tower as the northern point of Jerusalem in the rebuilding.

Analysis
Based on the description in Nehemiah 3, the tower of Hananeel stood midway between "the sheep gate" and "the fish gate", at the northeast corner of Jerusalem, then from this point, the wall of the city which had run northwestern from the sheep gate now turned to west.

As "Hananeel" (or "Hananel") means "God's grace", Schroeder notes that the Tower of Hananeel “metaphorically designates” the apostles and first believers who were "strengthened like a tower by the grace of the Holy Spirit descending on them on the Day of Pentecost with a visible sign".

References

External links
 Reconstruction of Jerusalem towers. In Jerusalem in the time of Nehemiah. A new presentation by Ritmeyer Archaeological Design

Buildings and structures in Jerusalem
Ezra–Nehemiah
Book of Jeremiah
Book of Zechariah